Stian Berget (born 2 June 1977) is a retired Norwegian footballer.

He hails from Rena and played for Ham-Kam from 1996 to 1999, then Lillestrøm SK before joining Nybergsund IL ahead of the 2005 season. He signed for Flisa IL ahead of the 2008 season, and then Elverum after the 2009 season.

He has also played for the Norwegian under-21 national team.

He started teaching PE at Elverum Videregående Skole in 2013.

References

1977 births
Living people
People from Åmot
Norwegian footballers
Hamarkameratene players
Lillestrøm SK players
Eliteserien players
Association football midfielders
Sportspeople from Innlandet